ESA most commonly refers to the European Space Agency.

ESA or Esa may also refer to:

Places 
 El Salvador, IOC country code
 Èze (French pronunciation: [ɛːz], Italian: Eza, Occitan: Esa), a commune in France

People 
 Esa (name), list of people with the name

Arts, entertainment, and media
 Esa, daughter of Etain, a character from Irish legend mentioned in the Banshenchas
 Environmental Station Alpha, a video game

Economics and finance 
 Coverdell Education Savings Account, an American investment account
 Economic Stabilization Agency, of the Government of the United States; defunct
 Employment and Support Allowance, a British Government state benefit
 Employment Standards Act, of the Parliament of Canada
 European Free Trade Association Surveillance Authority
 European Supervisory Authority in the European System of Financial Supervision
 European System of Accounts

Education 
 École Sainte-Anne, a French public middle/high school in Fredericton, New Brunswick, Canada
 École supérieure des affaires (Beirut), a Lebanese business school
 École Supérieure des Affaires (Lille), a French business school
 Episcopal School of Acadiana, in Cade, Louisiana, United States
 Etobicoke School of the Arts, in Toronto, Ontario, Canada
 European Security Academy, in Wroclaw, Poland

Professional associations 
 Ecological Society of America
 Entertainment Software Association, an American trade association
 Entomological Society of America
 Environmental Services Association, a British professional association
 European Seed Association
 European Sociological Association

Sport 
 Eastern Sports Association, a defunct Canadian wrestling promotion
 Eight Schools Association, an American athletic league
 English Shinty Association
 Raleigh Entertainment and Sports Arena, now PNC Arena, in North Carolina, United States

Technology
 Electronically scanned array
 Electrostatic analyzer
 Emergency Stand Alone, a mode of distributed switching in telecommunications
 End of Selected Area, a C1 control code
 Enthusiast System Architecture, a computer bus protocol
 Erythropoiesis-stimulating agent
 Explicit semantic analysis
 IBM ESA/390, a mainframe computing design
 Sonex Electric Sport Aircraft, an electric aircraft
 Enhanced suffix arrays; a variant of Suffix array

Other uses
 Australian Capital Territory Emergency Services Agency
 East Side Access, a public works project in New York City
 Eastern sigillata A, a type of ancient east Mediterranean pottery
 Emotional support animal
 Endangered Species Act of 1973, of the United States Congress
 Environmental site assessment, for American real estate companies 
 Environmental systems analysis, a methodology 
 Epsilon Sigma Alpha, an American collegiate and service organization
European Speedrunner Assembly, a video gaming event 
 European Symposium on Algorithms, a computer science conference 
 Greek Military Police
 Secret Anti-Communist Army, active in the Guatemalan Civil War